73rd NBR Awards
December 5, 2001

Best Film: 
 Moulin Rouge! 
The 73rd National Board of Review Awards, honoring the best in filmmaking in 2001, were announced on 5 December 2001 and given on 7 January 2002.

Top 10 films
Moulin Rouge!
In the Bedroom
Ocean's Eleven
Memento
Monster's Ball
Black Hawk Down
The Man Who Wasn't There
A.I. Artificial Intelligence
The Pledge
Mulholland Drive

Top Foreign Films
Amores perros
Behind the Sun
Dark Blue World
No Man's Land
Amélie

Winners
Best Film: 
Moulin Rouge!
Best Foreign Language Film:
Amores perros, Mexico
Best Actor:
Billy Bob Thornton - The Man Who Wasn't There, Monster's Ball, Bandits
Best Actress:
Halle Berry - Monster's Ball
Best Supporting Actor:
Jim Broadbent - Iris and Moulin Rouge!
Best Supporting Actress:
Cate Blanchett - The Lord of the Rings: The Fellowship of the Ring, The Man Who Cried, and The Shipping News
Best Acting by an Ensemble:
Last Orders
Breakthrough Performance - Male:
Hayden Christensen - Life as a House
Breakthrough Performance - Female:
Naomi Watts - Mulholland Drive
Best Director:
Todd Field - In the Bedroom
Outstanding Directorial Debut:
John Cameron Mitchell - Hedwig and the Angry Inch
Best Screenplay:
In the Bedroom - Robert Festinger and Todd Field
Best Documentary Feature:
The Endurance: Shackleton's Legendary Antarctic Expedition
Best Animated Feature:
Shrek
Best Film made for Cable TV:
Wit
Career Achievement Award:
Jon Voight
Billy Wilder Award For Excellence In Directing:
Steven Spielberg
Special Filmmaking Achievement:
Peter Jackson - The Lord of the Rings: The Fellowship of the Ring
Best Art Direction:
Grant Major - The Lord of the Rings: The Fellowship of the Ring
Career Achievement - Music Composition:
John Williams
Humanitarian Award:
Arthur Cohn
William K. Everson Award For Film History:
Martin Scorsese, My Voyage to Italy
Freedom Of Expression:
Baran
Jung in the Land of the Mujaheddin
Kandahar
Special Recognition For Excellence In Filmmaking:
The Anniversary Party
The Deep End
Diamond Men
Ghost World
Happy Accidents
Iris
Lantana
L.I.E.
Piñero
Sexy Beast

External links
National Board of Review of Motion Pictures :: Awards for 2001

2001
2001 film awards
2001 in American cinema